Helicia petiolaris is a plant in the family Proteaceae. The specific epithet petiolaris means "stalked", referring to the leaves.

Description
Its bark is grey-brown.

Distribution and habitat
Helicia petiolaris is native to Myanmar, Thailand, Vietnam, Peninsular Malaysia, Singapore and Borneo. Its habitat is mixed dipterocarp and kerangas forests to  altitude.

References

petiolaris
Trees of Indo-China
Trees of Malaya
Trees of Borneo
Plants described in 1838